Christian Beisel (born 8 December 1982) is a retired German footballer who played in the 2. Bundesliga for SV Waldhof Mannheim.

References

External links

1982 births
Living people
German footballers
SV Waldhof Mannheim players
SV Darmstadt 98 players
SV Sandhausen players
1. FC Heidenheim players
FC 08 Homburg players
2. Bundesliga players
3. Liga players
Association football defenders
Sportspeople from Darmstadt